Polydendrorhynchus is a monotypic genus of nemerteans belonging to the family Polybrachiorhynchidae. The only species is Polydendrorhynchus zhanjiangensis.

References

Monotypic nemertea genera
Heteronemertea
Nemertea genera